The Tartan 27 is an American trailerable sailboat that was designed by Sparkman & Stephens as a cruiser-racer and first built in 1961. It is Sparkman & Stephens' design #1617.

The design was developed into the Tartan 27 Yawl in 1961 and the Tartan 27-2 in 1976.

Production
The design was initially built by Douglass & McLeod in the United States, starting in 1961. Douglass & McLeod's production ended when their Grand River, Ohio factory burned down in 1971. Production was then taken over by a new company, Tartan Marine, established in neighboring Painesville, Ohio, in 1971. The Tartan 27 was the new company's first product, as well as the inspiration for the corporate name. Production of the Tartan 27 continued at Tartan Marine until 1980, a 19-year production run. W. D. Schock Corp also built 24 of the boats between 1964 and 1968 in their California plant to serve the US west coast market. In total 712 boats were completed by the time production ended.

Design
The Tartan 27 is a recreational keelboat, built predominantly of fiberglass, with wood trim. It has a masthead sloop rig, a raked stem, an angled transom, a keel-mounted rudder controlled by a tiller and a fixed modified long keel with a cutaway forefoot and a retractable centerboard. It displaces  and carries  of ballast.

The cockpit was made longer in 1973, the bridge deck distance increased, and the interior decor changed to teak. Various interior layouts were used, as well.

The boat is fitted with a  Universal Atomic 4 gasoline engine for docking and maneuvering.

In a typical layout, the design has sleeping accommodation for four people, with a double "V"-berth in the bow cabin, and an "L"-shaped settee in the main cabin around a drop-down dinette table. The galley is located on the starboard side amidships. The galley is equipped with a two-burner stove, an ice box and a sink. The head is located just aft of the bow cabin on the port side.

Operational history
In a 2010 review for Boats.com, Charles Doane wrote, "because of its relatively long waterline, the Tartan 27 does sail faster than you might otherwise expect, especially on a reach, but compared to much lighter, more contemporary boats it inevitably seems a bit slow. It is, however, very well balanced, so much so that one can steer it by letting go the tiller and shifting the centerboard up and down."

Darrell Nicholson, writing for Practical Sailor concluded, "the 27 has its limitations: a cramped interior, 'age spots' such as scruffy gelcoat, possible deck delamination, centerboard wear, gas engines getting on in years, and, in an age of sailing performance, so-so speed. Virtues and flaws balanced, however, the Tartan 27 strikes us as having most of what we would look for in an older small cruising boat from the standpoint of ruggedness, appearance, function, and equity." Nicholson made extensive recommendations for updating and upgrading the boat.

See also
List of sailing boat types

Related development
Tartan 27 Yawl
Tartan 27-2

References

External links

Keelboats
1960s sailboat type designs
Sailing yachts
Trailer sailers
Sailboat type designs by Sparkman and Stephens
Sailboat types built by Douglass & McLeod
Sailboat types built by Tartan Marine
Sailboat types built by W. D. Schock Corp